Mississippi Valley Airlines (IATA--XV) was a regional air carrier serving the Upper Midwestern region of the United States. It was founded by Herb Lee, Norm Elsy and Charles A. ("Chuck") Draine as Gateway Aviation, and had its headquarters in La Crosse, Wisconsin. Chuck Draine served as Chairman and Chief Executive Officer. It began scheduled flight operations on July 22, 1968 between La Crosse Municipal Airport and both Chicago (O'Hare International Airport) and Milwaukee (General Mitchell International Airport). The carrier changed its name to Mississippi Valley Airways in October 1969. It became Mississippi Valley Airlines (MVA) and moved its headquarters to Quad City Airport in Moline, Illinois in January 1982.   The airline merged into Air Wisconsin on May 17, 1985 in a $10 million share exchange transaction.  At the time of the merger, Mississippi Valley Airlines was the United States' eighth-largest regional airline in terms of ridership.

Destinations

Alexandria, Minnesota
Benton Harbor, Michigan
Burlington, Iowa
Cedar Rapids, Iowa
Champaign-Urbana, Illinois
Chicago, Illinois (O'Hare)
Clinton, Iowa
Columbia, Missouri
Dubuque, Iowa
Kansas City, Missouri
La Crosse, Wisconsin
Lincoln, Nebraska
Madison, Wisconsin
Marshall, Minnesota
Mason City, Iowa
Milwaukee, Wisconsin
Minneapolis, Minnesota
Moline, Illinois
Omaha, Nebraska
Ottumwa, Iowa
Peoria, Illinois
Prairie du Chien, Wisconsin
St. Louis, Missouri
Springfield, Illinois
Willmar, Minnesota
Winona, Minnesota

Turboprop fleet

Beechcraft Model 99
de Havilland Canada DHC-6 Twin Otter
Fokker F27
Short 330
Short 360

Accidents
Although the airline had no fatal accidents, it lost one aircraft during in-flight operations, a Twin Otter which hit trees upon landing at La Crosse, Wisconsin.

See also 
 List of defunct airlines of the United States

References

Defunct airlines of the United States
Moline, Illinois
Defunct companies based in Illinois
Defunct companies based in Wisconsin
Airlines established in 1968
Airlines disestablished in 1985
1968 establishments in Wisconsin